Burkina Faso competed at the 1988 Summer Olympics in Seoul, South Korea.  It had been 16 years since the previous participation of the nation at the Olympic Games, then as Upper Volta at the 1972 Summer Olympics.

Competitors
The following is the list of number of competitors in the Games.

Athletics

Key
Note–Ranks given for track events are within the athlete's heat only
Q = Qualified for the next round
q = Qualified for the next round as a fastest loser or, in field events, by position without achieving the qualifying target
NR = National record
N/A = Round not applicable for the event
Bye = Athlete not required to compete in round

Men
Track & road events

Field

Women
Track & road events

Boxing

References

Official Olympic Reports

Nations at the 1988 Summer Olympics
1988
Oly